South Canara was a district of the Madras Presidency of British India, located at . It comprised the towns of Kasaragod and Udupi and adjacent villages, with the capital in Mangalore city. South Canara was one of the most heterogeneous areas of Madras Presidency, with Tulu, Malayalam, Kannada, Konkani, Marathi, Urdu, and Beary languages being spoken side by side. It was succeeded by the Tulu-speaking areas of Dakshina Kannada district, the Malayalam-speaking area of Kasaragod district and the Amindivi islands sub-division of the Laccadives, in the year 1956.

Geography
Mangalore was the administrative headquarters of the district.

South Canara District was bordered by North Canara to north, the princely state of Mysore to east, Coorg state to southeast, Malabar District to south, and Arabian Sea to west. South Canara was one of the two districts on the western coast (Malabar coast) of Madras Presidency along with Malabar District (otherwise known as Malayalam District).

History
South Canara was annexed by the British East India Company following the defeat of Tipu Sultan in the Fourth Mysore War 1799 and along with North Kanara formed the district of Kanara in the Madras Presidency. In 1859, Kanara was split into two districts, North and South. North Kanara was transferred to the Bombay Presidency, and South was retained by Madras.

Taluks 

The district was divided into six taluks:

 Amindivi Islands (Laccadives) (Area:)
 Coondapoor (Area:; Headquarters: Coondapoor)
 Kasaragod (Area:; Headquarters: Kasaragod)
 Mangalore (Area:; Headquarters: Mangalore)
 Udupi (Area:; Headquarters: Udupi)
 Uppinangady (Area:; Headquarters: Puttur)

Administration 
The district was administered by a District Collector. For purpose of convenience, the district was divided into three sub-divisions:

 Coondapoor sub-division: Coondapoor and Udupi taluks
 Mangalore sub-division: Mangalore, and the Amindivi islands
 Puttur sub-division: Uppinangady and Kasaragod taluks.

The district had two municipalities, those of Mangalore and Udupi.

Demographics 

South Kanara had a total population of 1,748,991 in 1951, of whom 76.58% were Hindus, 14.31% Muslim and 8.85% Christian. The most widely spoken language was Tulu which was the mother tongue of 40 percent of the population, followed by Malayalam which formed the mother tongue of 24 percent of the population. Around 17 percent of the total population spoke Kannada. Around 13 percent of the population speaks Konkani as their mother tongue.

The 1908 Imperial Gazetteer of India lists South Canara, along with the Thanjavur and Ganjam districts, as the three districts of the Madras Presidency where Brahmins are most numerous.

The majority of the people were Billavas and Bunts. There were more Brahmins (12% of the population) in South Kanara than any other district of the Madras Presidency making South Kanara, along with Tanjore and Ganjam as one of the three districts of the province where Brahmins were most numerous.

The original indigenous people of the region are Tuluvas (Bunts, Billavas, Mogaveeras, Tulu gowda, Kulalas, Devadigas, Bearys, Jogis) and Malayalis in the Kasaragod Taluk (Nambudiris, Nairs, Thiyyas, Mappilas etc). The Brahmins who settled first belonged chiefly to the Sthanika and thus they were called as Tulu Brahmins. Others were Shivalli, Saraswat, Havyaka, Kotaha sub-sections, Mahars, the hill-tribes (Koragas).

See also
 Dakshina Kannada
 Kasaragod district
 Mangalore
 Udupi
 Kasargod
 Amindivi
 Puttur

References

Further reading

External links
 South Canara by Vikas Kamat from Kamat.com

Regions of Karnataka
History of Mangalore
Districts of the Madras Presidency
South Kanara District
Regions of Kerala